The Poughkeepsie Galleria is a shopping center on U.S. 9 in the Town of Poughkeepsie, New York, located just north of Wappingers Falls, and is the largest shopping center in Dutchess County. The mall is anchored by the traditional chains Macy's, Dick's Sporting Goods, Best Buy, and Target while featuring prominent specialty stores American Eagle, Build-A-Bear, PacSun, Sephora, H&M, Hollister, and Windsor.

The Galleria is owned and managed by The Pyramid Companies, a group who also owns and manages regional sister mall the Palisades Center in West Nyack, NY.

History

Expansion & Policies 
In the early 1980s, a proposal for a two-story indoor mall in Poughkeepsie, New York was submitted. Despite much conflict and many protests, the proposal was submitted, and the mall opened on August 1, 1987 as the Poughkeepsie Galleria Mall.
 
Upon opening, the mall had five anchor stores: G. Fox & Co., Jordan Marsh, Lechmere, Filene's, and JCPenney. Due to underperformance, the Filene's store closed in 1989 and was replaced with Steinbach, which relocated from South Hills Mall next door. Sears also announced plans to relocate from South Hills Plaza at the same time. Steinbach closed in 1995 and became Dick's Sporting Goods and DSW Shoe Warehouse the same year. Filene's returned to the mall in 1993 by taking over the defunct G. Fox chain, while Sears ultimately opened at the mall after Jordan Marsh was vacated. Montgomery Ward also moved into the mall in the early 1990s, becoming the sixth anchor and replacing an existing store in Poughkeepsie.

In 2004, both DSW and Dick's moved to new locations vacated by Montgomery Ward, while the former Filene's and Lechmere building was converted to Best Buy and Target.

During January 2005, the mall announced it would enact and begin enforcing the Pyramid Companies' "MB-18" teenage curfew policy beginning in September 2005, following a large fight involving young teenagers in front of then-Filene's. Due to the size of the incident, local police were called, and several arrests were made. Filene's was converted to Macy's in 2006.

The early 2020s saw multiple traditional chain anchors update their brick-and-mortar fleets after being disrupted by digital retailers in recent years.

On February 8, 2020, It was announced Sears would shutter as part of an ongoing plan to phase out of brick-and-mortar.

On June 23, 2020, JCPenney announced as part of modernizing their brick-and-mortar operations that they'll no longer continue to position an outpost in the region.

Several potential replacement tenants for each space are reportedly pending. By October 2022, after reopening from the COVID-19 shut down, the Galleria had announced newest additions 110 Grill, The Village Pancake Factory, and Windsor.

COVID-19 Pandemic 
As a result of an executive order to curtail the spread of the novel coronavirus, the Galleria announced they would close the interior portion of the mall effective 8:00pm on March 19, 2020. This effectively shuttered all businesses without an exterior entrance of their own. Some anchors with external entrances such as Target remained operational as they were considered an essential business. On July 10, 2020, the interior portion of the mall reopened with reduced hours as part of Governor Cuomo's Phase 4 economic reopening plan. This was allowed so long as certain conditions were met, such as the presence of enhanced air filtration technologies which could trap virus particles. The mall has continued to operate with reduced hours since reopening.
On October 5, 2020, Cineworld announced it would close all Regal, Cineworld, and Picturehouse Cinemas locations in the US, UK, and Ireland indefinitely, beginning October 8. CEO Mooky Greidinger specifically cited that the continued reluctance of New York to allow cinemas to open was the main factor, as well as the lack of tentpole Hollywood films (referring to the delay of No Time to Die from November to April 2021 as being the "last straw") due to the high cost of operating a cinema without new releases. Mooky argued that the studios were holding off on new releases until New York cinemas reopen (accusing Governor Andrew Cuomo of being inflexible, despite having allowed other forms of indoor businesses to resume operations), and that the company only planned to reopen its cinemas once it is confident there is a "clear" and "solid" lineup of new releases.

References

External links

Poughkeepsie Galleria homepage
Pyramid profile of Poughkeepsie Galleria

Shopping malls established in 1987
Shopping malls in New York (state)
The Pyramid Companies
Buildings and structures in Poughkeepsie, New York
U.S. Route 9
Tourist attractions in Poughkeepsie, New York
Shopping malls in the New York metropolitan area